Miroslav Klůc (1 December 1922 in Nesuchyně – 4 December 2012) was a Czech ice hockey player who competed in the 1956 Winter Olympics.

References

1922 births
2012 deaths
Czech ice hockey centres
Olympic ice hockey players of Czechoslovakia
Ice hockey players at the 1956 Winter Olympics
HC Litvínov players
People from Rakovník District
Sportspeople from the Central Bohemian Region
Yugoslavia national ice hockey team coaches
Czechoslovak ice hockey coaches
Czech ice hockey coaches
Czechoslovak ice hockey centres
Czechoslovak expatriate ice hockey people
Czechoslovak expatriate sportspeople in Yugoslavia
Czechoslovak expatriate sportspeople in Switzerland
Piráti Chomutov players